Little Harbour Deep was a settlement located northwest of Baie Verte.  On July 31, 1965, the town was depopulated.

See also 
 List of communities in Newfoundland and Labrador

Ghost towns in Newfoundland and Labrador